Bituše is a village in the municipality of Mavrovo and Rostuša, North Macedonia.

Demographics
Bituše is attested in the Ottoman defter of 1467 as a village in the ziamet of Reka which was under the authority of Karagöz Bey. The village had a total of three households and the anthroponymy attested alludes to an Albanian character.  

According to the 2002 census, the village had a total of 96 inhabitants. Ethnic groups in the village include:
Macedonians 95
Serbs 1

As of the 2021 census, Bituše had 161 residents with the following ethnic composition:
Macedonians 128
Others (including Torbeš) 29
Others 3
Persons for whom data are taken from administrative sources 1

References

Villages in Mavrovo and Rostuša Municipality